The 17th Kentucky Cavalry Regiment was a cavalry regiment that served in the Union Army during the American Civil War.

Service
The 17th Kentucky Cavalry Regiment was organized at Russellville, Kentucky and mustered in for one year. It mustered in under the command of Colonel Samuel F. Johnson.

The regiment was attached to Military Department of Kentucky and assigned to duty at Hopkinsville, Kentucky, and in southern Kentucky, along the Louisville and Nashville Railroad.

The 17th Kentucky Cavalry mustered out on September 20, 1865.

Casualties
The regiment lost no members during service.

Commanders
 Colonel Samuel F. Johnson

See also

 List of Kentucky Civil War Units
 Kentucky in the Civil War

References
 Dyer, Frederick H. A Compendium of the War of the Rebellion (Des Moines, IA: Dyer Pub. Co.), 1908.
Attribution
 

Military units and formations established in 1865
Military units and formations disestablished in 1865
Units and formations of the Union Army from Kentucky
1865 establishments in Kentucky